Kerton Township is one of twenty-six townships in Fulton County, Illinois, USA.  As of the 2010 census, its population was 121 and it contained 81 housing units.

Geography

Unincorporated towns
 Enion
 Marbletown
(This list is based on USGS data and may include former settlements.)
 West Point
 Seahorn
 Hickory
 West Matanza
 Kerton Valley
 Cluny

Cemeteries
The township contains Hickory Cemetery.

Major highways
  Illinois Route 100

Lakes
 Anderson Lake

Demographics

School districts
 Lewistown School District 97

Political districts
 Illinois' 17th congressional district
 State House District 94
 State Senate District 47

References
 
 United States Census Bureau 2007 TIGER/Line Shapefiles
 United States National Atlas

External links
 City-Data.com
 Illinois State Archives

Townships in Fulton County, Illinois
Townships in Illinois